The Captive City is a 1952 American film noir crime film directed by Robert Wise and starring John Forsythe. The screenplay is based on real life experiences of Time magazine reporter Alvin M. Josephy, Jr., who co-wrote the script.

Plot
Newspaper editor and co-owner Jim Austin and his wife are fleeing Kennington, where they live and work, so that he may testify before a U.S. Senate Special Committee investigating crime in interstate commerce.  They are being pursued by the criminal element from their town and pull off the highway in a place called Warren, where they take refuge in a police station. Austin requests an escort to ensure they arrive safely at the committee location.  He also gets permission to use the station's tape recorder, on which he chronicles the events which have brought him to this point.

Austin began investigating bookmaking in town after the suspicious death of private detective Clyde Nelson, who discovered police complicity with illegal gambling while working a divorce case for a Mrs. Sirak.  Her ex-husband, Murray Sirak, happened to be the major bookmaker in Kennington.

Austin questioned the police response to Nelson's death, then began an investigation himself after being goaded by the Chief of Police.  Austin discovered that mafia-affiliated gangster Dominick Fabretti had moved into town, then Sirak attempted to squelch Austin's activity with a bribe, and Austin and his wife were continually harassed.

The city fathers, the police, and the respectable elements of the community all consented to the gambling, arguing that betting is inevitable, and that exposing it would injure the city's reputation.  Mrs. Sirak was murdered after she agreed to disclose that Fabretti was responsible for Nelson's murder.  Austin's partner at the newspaper dropped his support for Austin because they are losing advertisers and vendors due to his crusade.

To stop Fabretti and his activities, Austin's final recourse was an appeal for help from the local ministers.  When even they declined to get involved, Austin decided to appeal to the Senate Crime Commission at the Capital.  A grave threat from Sirak spurred Austin and his wife to flee in the middle of the night, followed by Fabretti's henchmen.

They do get the requested police escort, and safely make it to the commission hearing.

Cast
 John Forsythe as Jim Austin
 Joan Camden as Marge Austin
 Harold J. Kennedy as Don Carey
 Marjorie Crossland as Mrs. Sirak
 Victor Sutherland as Murray Sirak
 Ray Teal as Chief Gillette
 Martin Milner as Phil Harding
 Geraldine Hall as Mrs. Nelson
 Hal K. Dawson as Clyde Nelson
 Ian Wolfe as Rev. Nash
 Gladys Hurlbut as Linda Purcy
 Jess Kirkpatrick as Anderson
 Paul Newlan as Krug
 Frances Morris as Mrs. Harding
 Paul Brinegar as Police Sergeant 
 Paul Goldwater as Sally Carey
 Robert Gorell as Joe Berg
 Glenn Judd as Coverly
 William C. Miller as Coroner

Background
The screenplay of The Captive City was inspired by the Kefauver Committee's hearings. The television broadcast of the hearings attracted huge public interest and educated a broad audience about the issues of municipal corruption and organized crime. The tremendous success of the broadcast led to the production of a whole cycle of "exposé" crime films dealing with the dismantling of complex criminal organizations by law enforcement.

The Captive City had the blessing of senator Kefauver himself: Robert Wise took a print of the film to Washington D. C. to show to senator Kefauver, who not only endorsed it but even gives a written statement in the prologue and appears in the epilogue, cautioning audiences about the evils of organized crime.

Other notable examples of exposé films include Hoodlum Empire (1952) and The Turning Point (1952).

References

External links 
 
 
 
 
 

1952 films
1952 crime drama films
American black-and-white films
American crime drama films
1950s English-language films
Fictional newspaper editors
Films about journalists
Film noir
Films about organized crime in the United States
Films directed by Robert Wise
Films scored by Jerome Moross
Films shot in Nevada
Mafia films
United Artists films
1950s American films